Daechu-cha is a traditional Korean tea made from jujubes. The tea is deep ruby-brown to rich dark maroon in color and is abundant in iron, potassium, and vitamins B and C. It is often garnished with pine nuts.

Preparation 
There are two ways to make daechu-cha: boiling dried jujubes or diluting the preserved jujubes into boiling water. Preserved jujubes can be made by simmering dried—preferably sun-dried—jujubes on low heat for about eight hours to a day, until the liquid becomes sweet and syrupy. A pre-made sweet jujube syrup is also commercially available in Korean grocery stores.

See also 
 Daechu-gom

References 

Herbal tea
Korean tea
Traditional Korean medicine